Cecilia Matilde López Montaño (born April 18, 1943) is an economist and Colombian politician. A member of the Liberal Party, she has been appointed to several cabinet positions. On September 27, 2009, she was a runner-up in the presidential primaries and was the only female candidate amongst six other members of the party.

Biography
She began her education at the Parrish and La Enseñanza schools in Barranquilla. She graduated as an economist from University of the Andes in Bogotá and later received two postgraduate degrees from the Centro de Estudios Educativos, Mexico in Demography and the Economy of Education.

She was Department Head of a key unit at the National Planning Department (1978–1980); Managing Director of Fonade (1981–1982), Vice Minister of Agriculture (1982–1985); Ambassador of Colombia in The Netherlands (1985–1988); Director of PREALC, Regional Employment Program for Latin America and the Caribbean from International Labour Organization -ILO- and United Nations Organization -ONU-, (1988–1990), Director of the Social Security Department (1990–1992), President of Consenso (1992–1994); Minister of Environment (1994–1996); Minister of Agriculture (1996–1997); Director of the National Planning Department (1997–1998); International Consultant (1998–2006); President of Agenda Colombia Foundation, (2002–2006), and Senator of the republic of Colombia with the Liberal Party (2006–2010).

She has served as president of the Group of Parliamentarian Women of the Americas at the Inter-Parliamentary Forum of the Americas (FIPA) in Canada. She has been active in Cartagena's Feminist Initiative.

Internationally, she has served on the board of directors of the Washington, D.C.-based International Food Policy Research Institute (IFPRI); the World Wide Group of experts on Intellectual Property from the World Health Organization (WHO) in Switzerland; the International Water Management Institute located in Sri Lanka with Rawoo, the Advisory Council of the Dutch Government; and Globalization for Development in New York. 

Within Colombia, she has served on the boards of Fedesarrollo and the Natura Foundation.

On July 5, 2022, President-Elect Gustavo Petro said he would name her Minister of Agriculture.

Senate of Colombia (2006 - 2010)
At the Senate, Ms. López is recognized for her strong political control on government issues such as: Colombia's economy, debates on the army's Human Rights violations with the Defense Minister, the Carimagua's land situation and its relationship with the displaced people's rights with the Agriculture Minister; the government's management of the financial crisis due to the pyramids case and a thorough study on the convenience for Colombia of the Free Trade Agreements with the United States and the European Union.

Concerning legislation, her most notable work is the presentation of the Bill for social transformation. This law promotes to redefine the national development model forcing the State to provide access to all Colombian citizens to a minimum amount of good quality services.

Acknowledgements
On July 20, 2008, the Senator was appointed the Colombian Liberal Party's spokeswoman. By the end of that year, she was nominated by her colleagues, and won Senator of the year award. A nationally recognized award presented by Canal RCN. At the same time, she was chosen by Revista Cambio, as the best member of the Colombian Congress.

Throughout her professional career, she has received the Cruz de Boyacá Medal, the most important recognition given by the Colombian Government to the citizens that have served the nation with honor. She also received the highest congressional decoration for her contribution to the country's development, and the Queen Beatrice of The Netherlands decoration for her role as Colombian Ambassador in that country.

Senator Lopez was the only female of seven Liberal Party candidates running for the party's nomination for the President of Colombia in 2009.

Writing
López has published and edited 14 books as well as academic and newspaper articles.

References

External links
 Institutional Website

|-

|-

|-

1943 births
Living people
People from Barranquilla
Cabinet of Gustavo Petro
Government ministers of Colombia
Members of the Senate of Colombia
Ambassadors of Colombia to the Netherlands
Women government ministers of Colombia
Colombian women ambassadors
20th-century Colombian politicians
20th-century Colombian women politicians
21st-century Colombian politicians
21st-century Colombian women politicians